The Graham Building is a 1926 Prairie style building on Stolp Island in Aurora, Illinois. It was individually listed on the National Register of Historic Places in 1982. Also, it is a contributing property in a historic district.

History
The Graham Building was designed by George Grant Elmslie, a leading student of Louis Sullivan. It was one of five buildings Elmslie designed in Aurora, Illinois. The Graham Building is the tallest of the buildings he designed for the city. William Graham was a contractor who commissioned the building. He immigrated from Nova Scotia, Canada in the 1890s. He owned this building until his death in the 1950s. The National Park Service listed it on the National Register of Historic Places on March 19, 1982. On September 10, 1986, it was listed as a contributing property to the Stolp Island Historic District.

Architecture
The eight-story building was designed the Prairie School architectural style. It is trapezoidal in shape, and is built with steel-reinforced concrete. The exterior is brick in a stretcher bond, with a polished granite first floor street facade. Casement windows with transoms are wood-framed. Windows on the side facades are standard double-hung windows. Little effort was put into the side facade because it was thought that other office buildings would soon be built adjacent to it. Entry doors are recessed  from the edge of the openings. The main facades at Stolp Avenue and the Fox River feature decorative terracotta and brick coursing designs below the second story windows.

References

National Register of Historic Places in Kane County, Illinois
Prairie School architecture in Illinois
Commercial buildings completed in 1926
Buildings and structures in Aurora, Illinois
Commercial buildings on the National Register of Historic Places in Illinois
Historic district contributing properties in Illinois
George Grant Elmslie buildings